Paul Couillaud (31 December 1893 – 15 March 1962) was a French long jumper. He competed at the 1924 Summer Olympics and finished 24th.

References

1893 births
1962 deaths
French male long jumpers
Olympic athletes of France
Athletes (track and field) at the 1924 Summer Olympics